Kitazume (written: 北爪) is a Japanese surname. Notable people with the surname include:

, Japanese animator, manga artist and illustrator
, Japanese footballer
, Japanese classical composer and conductor
, Japanese composer

Japanese-language surnames